Chastity is the first soundtrack album featuring American singer-actress Cher, released on June 1969 by Atco.  It was released to promote and accompany the 1969 motion picture, Chastity. The album, like the film from which it came, was a commercial failure.

Album information
The Chastity album was released in the summer of 1969, the same date as Cher's album 3614 Jackson Highway, and was written and produced by Sonny Bono. The soundtrack is largely instrumental, with vocals by Cher on the track "Chastity's Song (Band of Thieves)"— the only song on the album written by Elyse Weinberg. This song was also released as a single, with "I Walk on Guilded Splinters" as the B-side.

Track listing
All tracks written by Sonny Bono except "Chastity's Song (Band of Thieves)" by Elyse J. Weinberg.

Personnel
Cher - lead vocals
Sonny Bono - record producer
Stan Ross - sound engineer
Don Peake - arrangement assistance
Greg Poree - arrangement assistance (track 1)
Alessio de Paola - photography

References

External links
Official Cher site

Cher albums
1969 soundtrack albums
Atco Records soundtracks
Albums produced by Sonny Bono
Romance film soundtracks
Drama film soundtracks